Qiu Guohong (born December 1957) is a Chinese diplomat who served as the Chinese Ambassador to South Korea from 2014 to 2020 and Chinese Ambassador to Nepal from 2008 to 2011.

Life and career
Qiu was born and raised in Shanghai. After graduating from Shanghai International Studies University he was assigned to the Ministry of Foreign Affairs of the People's Republic of China.

He spent 20 years working in the Chinese Embassy in Japan before serving as deputy director of the Asian Affairs of the Ministry of Foreign Affairs of the People's Republic of China.

In November 2008 he was promoted to become the Chinese Ambassador to Nepal, a position he held until April 2011.

He was director of Security Affairs of the Ministry of Foreign Affairs of the People's Republic of China in April 2011, and held that office until January 2014.

In January 2014, he was appointed the Chinese Ambassador to South Korea by 12th Standing Committee of the National People's Congress, succeeding Zhang Xinsen. His assignment in South Korea ended in 2020.

References

1957 births
Shanghai International Studies University alumni
Living people
Ambassadors of China to South Korea
Ambassadors of China to Nepal